Middleburg is a rural unincorporated community with a post office sitting just off the Green River in central Casey County, Kentucky, United States. The first land owner in the area was Abraham Lincoln I, the grandfather of president Abraham Lincoln, who purchased  in the area in 1784. In 1800, Lincoln transferred the land to Christopher Riffe.

Riffe built a home there and operated a mill, which began the focal point of the community. He was also the community's first postmaster when the post office first opened on February 11, 1837. He named it possibly for Middleburg, Virginia; or because of its location midway between Liberty and Hustonville.

References

Unincorporated communities in Casey County, Kentucky
Unincorporated communities in Kentucky